Paul Farren (born December 24, 1960) is a former American football Offensive tackle in the National Football League for the Cleveland Browns. Farren took over as the Browns' starting left tackle after Rickey Bolden was injured in 1989. Farren also played as a guard and a center when he attended Boston University. Farren was considered a long shot to make the pros.

1960 births
Living people
Boston University Terriers football players
Sportspeople from Weymouth, Massachusetts
American football offensive tackles
Boston University alumni
Cleveland Browns players